Bryn-minceg is a settlement in Cwm Cadnant, Ynys Môn, Wales.

References

See also
List of localities in Wales by population 

Villages in Anglesey